The International PuntaClassic Festival is an opera festival in Punta del Este, Uruguay. It takes place every January (for three weeks starting in late December) with performances of both operas and concerts.

The festival was founded by soprano Luz del Alba Rubio, who is also the Artistic Director.

The company has presented popular Italian operas in addition to a Gala-concert, "Latin sopranos" in 2011.

See also
 List of opera festivals

External links 
 
 

Opera festivals